HC Andersen may refer to:

Hans Christian Andersen, 19th century Danish writer and poet
HC Andersen (band), a Finnish rock band
HC Andersen (beer), a strong beer brewed by Albani Brewery